Michel Mertens (30 January 1902 – 23 December 1971) was a Luxembourgian weightlifter. He competed at the 1920 Summer Olympics and the 1924 Summer Olympics.

References

External links
 

1902 births
1971 deaths
Luxembourgian male weightlifters
Olympic weightlifters of Luxembourg
Weightlifters at the 1920 Summer Olympics
Weightlifters at the 1924 Summer Olympics
Sportspeople from Luxembourg (Belgium)